Hoseynabad-e Jangal (also Romanized as Ḩoseynābād-e Jangal; also known as Ḩasanābād) is a village in Ghazali Rural District, Miyan Jolgeh District, Nishapur County, Razavi Khorasan Province, Iran. At the 2006 census, its population was 627, in 149 families.

References 

Populated places in Nishapur County